Zuzana Ondrouchová (20 March 1950 – 3 February 1978) was a Czechoslovak actress born in Prague into the family of a medical doctor. The actor Petr Svárovský was her husband.

Career
After the graduation on DAMU she moved to Karlovy Vary where she played in Vítězslav Nezval Theater. She worked for Czechoslovak Television and for Film Studios Barrandov. Her last role was Eva Kroupová in the movie Tomorrow I'll Wake Up and Scald Myself with Tea.

Death
She died month before her 28th birthday of leukemia in Prague.

Filmography
Honzíkova cesta (1956)
Prázdniny v oblacích (1959)
Život pro Jana Kašpara (1959)
Zpívající pudřenka (1959)
Probuzení (1959)
Osení (1960)
Malý Bobeš (1961)
Pohled do očí (1961)
Táto, sežeň štěně! (1964)
If a Thousand Clarinets (1965)
Vrah skrývá tvář (1966)
Poklad byzantského kupce (1966)
Dívka s třemi velbloudy (1967)
Kateřina a její děti (1970)
Pan Tau (1970)
Za ranních červánků (1970)
Žebrácká opera (1971)
Pan Tau a taxikář (1972)
Byl jednou jeden dům (1974)
Osvobození Prahy (1975)
Profesoři za školou (1975)
Boty plné vody (1976)
Blaťácká povídačka (1977)
Zítra vstanu a opařím se čajem (1977)
Ve znamení Merkura (1978)
Zamřížované zrcadlo (1978)

External links
 Czechoslovak Film Database
 Television Magazine

Notes

Czech television actresses
Czech film actresses
Czech stage actresses
1950 births
1978 deaths
20th-century Czech actresses
Actresses from Prague
Deaths from cancer in Czechoslovakia
Deaths from leukemia